SoloPower is a solar energy company developing and manufacturing Copper indium gallium selenide (CIGS) Thin-film flexible Photo-voltaic Solar Panels. The company uses a special electroplating technology to utilize nearly 100% of its materials.

SoloPower is based in San Jose, California, and has achieved the distinction of being the first company to obtain UL Certification of CIGS flexible solar panels in 2010. This was lauded as a significant achievement by California Governor Arnold Schwarzenegger. Later the same year, the company also received IEC Certification (IEC 61646 and 61730) of its flexible CIGS solar panels, again an industry first. In March 2012, the company's modules set a world record aperture efficiency of 13.4% for flexible CIGS Solar Panels, as measured by NREL.

Company history
SoloPower was founded by Bulent Basol and Homayoun Talieh in 2005. The company started its pilot manufacturing line in December of the same year.  In 2010, the company secured $45 million in debt financing and used $19.9 million of that to acquire the shares of ousted founders Talieh and Basol.

In 2010, SoloPower held talks with the town of Wilsonville, Oregon to set up a manufacturing plant there. In 2011, the United States Department of Energy approved a $197 Million Loan Guarantee to the company, enabling a 400MW manufacturing plant in Oregon. In May 2011, SoloPower decided to move the manufacturing facility to Portland instead.  In April, 2013, SoloPower announced plans to suspend operations at the Portland plant and gut the remaining workforce.

SoloPower was announced a winner of the 2012 TiE50 award in the category of Clean Energy.

The company closed its doors in later 2017 and no longer operational.

Funding
The Norwegian firms Convexa Capital, Spencer Energy and Scatec have invested approximately $30 Million into SoloPower in 2007. The United States Department of Energy funded the company with $197 million from the same program that funded Solyndra, as have the City of Portland and agencies in the State of Oregon, which provided $56.5 million, and the California Energy Commission. In early 2011, the company received $13.5 Million from Crosslink Capital. Lead investors in the company include Hudson Clean Energy Partners, Crosslink Capital, Convexa, and Firsthand.

In the summer of 2017, the State of Oregon's Department of Energy paid $641,835 to cover SoloPower's back rent.

Governments pay for defaults
The City of Portland pays $119,000 per month until late 2020 to cover for SoloPower's default on a loan the City guaranteed under Mayor Sam Adams in 2011.  The money is taken out of Portland's Bureau of Transportation.  The Bureau of Transportation pays because parking-meter revenue was used as guaranty.

See also 

 List of CIGS companies
 SoloPower Systems

References

External links
 SoloPower company website

Solar energy companies of the United States
Photovoltaics manufacturers
Thin-film cell manufacturers
Manufacturing companies based in San Jose, California
Technology companies based in the San Francisco Bay Area
Energy companies established in 2005
Manufacturing companies established in 2005
Renewable resource companies established in 2005
2005 establishments in California
American companies established in 2005